Gołuchów  is a village in Pleszew County, Greater Poland Voivodeship, in central Poland. It is the seat of the gmina (administrative district) called Gmina Gołuchów.

The village has an approximate population of 2,200 (2005) and is renowned for its fairy-tale castle.

References

Villages in Pleszew County